Michael Doerr (born January 14, 1989), known professionally as Zookeper (stylized as Zookëper) is an American electronic music artist and producer from New Jersey. 

Doerr went under the alias in 2013. He released his own original songs in 2015, including "Gunz" and "Move off Ya Feet". On tour, he was a supporting act for Tritonal, Bingo Players, and others. 

He is best known for his singles, "Watch Me" and "Parallel Lines" that reached the top ten on the dance charts. He garnered over 40 million streams on Spotify and has also done remixes for the likes of John Mayer, Cher, Jason Derulo, The Knocks, and Teyana Taylor among others.

Career
Doerr initially started his career as a touring guitarist for Cash Cash in 2008. He was credited on their 2008 debut album, Take It to the Floor, as the photo editor. He left the group in August 2009. In 2011, Doerr did a remix to the song "Dirty People" by Alsex.

In 2013, Doerr began going under the name, Zookëper, remixing songs for other artists such as the Ready Set and Goldhouse. He started to release original songs of his own in 2015. He released his debut single "Move off Ya Feet", in December.

In 2018, he made a remix to John Mayer's song, "New Light" which has gone on to become double platinum in the United States. He also released a single that year titled, "For Real", which peaked on the Belgium Ultratip chart as an "extra tip" position. His single "Do You Think About Me" reached number four on the UK Commercial Pop Top 30 chart. His breakout hit "Watch Me" entered the Billboard Dance/Mix Show Airplay chart at number 27, and later peaked at number 15 on the week of July 20, 2019. The song also peaked at number six on the Mediabase Dance Radio Airplay Top 100 Chart. His follow up single "Parallel Lines" was released in August 2019 and performed better than "Watch Me" on the Dance/Mix Show Airplay chart peaking at number eight. The song was inspired by Howard Stern according to Doerr.

In 2021, Zookëper went on a US tour with Bingo Players called the "Bingo Beach Tour". He performed at the Lollapalooza festival in 2022.

Musical style
Speaking about what motivates him into making music, Doerr stated in an interview that he's, "not the type of producer who loves being locked in a room by himself all the time." He expresses that he loves being out, socializing, traveling, and "soaking in the energy of a packed room with music."

Production equipment and software
In the studio, Doerr uses Genelec monitors, KRK sub, a laptop, a MIDI keyboard, and a 909 machine. He also uses a Arturia Analog Lab plug-in suite and the Roland Cloud. Doerr states he tries to use "classic sounds as much as possible and to keep the arrangements bare."

Discography

Singles

Remixes

Other appearances

Notes

References

Living people

1989 births
American dance musicians
American DJs
Remixers